Starting in the mid-1970s and 1980s, the international propagation of Salafism and Wahhabism within Sunni Islam favored by the Kingdom of Saudi Arabia and other Gulf monarchies has achieved what the French political scientist Gilles Kepel defined as a "preeminent position of strength in the global expression of Islam." Until the 1990s Saudi (& GCC) break-up with Muslim Brotherhood, interpretations included not only Salafiyya Islam of Saudi Arabia, but also Islamist/revivalist Islam, and a "hybrid" of the two interpretations.

The impetus for the spread of the interpretations through the Muslim world was "the largest worldwide propaganda campaign ever mounted" (according to political scientist Alex Alexiev), "dwarfing the Soviets’ propaganda efforts at the height of the Cold War" (according to journalist David A. Kaplan), funded by petroleum exports which ballooned following the October 1973 War. One estimate is that during the reign of King Fahd (1982 to 2005), over $75 billion was spent in efforts to spread Wahhabi Islam. The money was used to establish 200 Islamic colleges, 210 Islamic centers, 1,500 mosques, and 2,000 schools for Muslim children in Muslim and Non-Muslim majority countries. The schools were "fundamentalist" in outlook and formed a network "from Sudan to northern Pakistan". The late king also launched a publishing center in Medina that by 2000 had distributed 138 million copies of the Quran (the central religious text of Islam) worldwide. Along with the millions of Qurans distributed free of charge came doctrinal texts following Salafi interpretations.

In the 1980s, Saudi Arabia's approximately 70 embassies around the world were equipped with religious attaches whose job it was to get new mosques built in their countries and to persuade existing mosques to propagate the dawah Salafiyya. The Saudi government funds a number of international organizations to spread fundamentalist Islam, including the Muslim World League, the World Assembly of Muslim Youth, the International Islamic Relief Organization, and various royal charities. Supporting dawah (literally "making an invitation" to Islam)—proselytizing or preaching of Islam—has been called "a religious requirement" for Saudi rulers that cannot be abandoned "without losing their domestic legitimacy" as protectors and propagators of Islam.

In addition to the Salafi interpretation of Islam, other strict and conservative interpretations of Sunni Islam directly or indirectly assisted by funds from Saudi Arabia and the Arab states of the Persian Gulf include those of Islamist organizations such as the Muslim Brotherhood and Jamaat-e-Islami. While their alliances were not always permanent, Salafism and forms of Islamism are said to have formed a "joint venture", sharing a strong "revulsion" against Western influences, a belief in strict implementation of injunctions and prohibitions of sharia law, an opposition to both Shia Islam and popular Islamic religious practices (the veneration of Muslim saints and visitations of their tombs), and a belief in the importance of armed jihad. Later the two movements are said to have been "fused", or formed a "hybrid", particularly as a result of the Afghan jihad of the 1980s against the Soviet Union, and resulted in the training and equipping of thousands of Muslims to fight against Soviets and their Afghan allies in Afghanistan in the 1980s.

The funding has been criticized for promoting an intolerant, fanatical form of Islam that allegedly helped to breed Islamic terrorism. Critics argue that volunteers mobilized to fight in Afghanistan (such as Osama bin Laden) and "exultant" at their success against the Soviet superpower, went on to fight jihad against Muslim governments and civilians in other countries. And that conservative Sunni groups such as the Taliban in Afghanistan and Pakistan are attacking and killing not only Non-Muslims (Kuffar) but also fellow Muslims they consider to be apostates, such as Shia and Sufis; as of 2017, changes to Saudi religious policy have led some to suggest that "Islamists throughout the world will have to follow suit or risk winding up on the wrong side of orthodoxy".

Background

Although Saudi Arabia had been an oil exporter since 1939, and active leading the conservative opposition among Arab states to Gamal Abdel Nasser's progressive and secularist Arab nationalism since the beginning of the Arab Cold War in the 1960s, it was the October 1973 War that greatly enhanced its wealth and stature, and ability to advocate Salafi missionary activities.

Prior to the 1973 oil embargo, religion throughout the Muslim world was "dominated by national or local traditions rooted in the piety of the common people." Clerics looked to their different schools of fiqh (the four Sunni Madhhabs, plus Shi'a Ja'fari):
 Hanafi in the Turkic lands, Eastern Mediterranean and South Asia;
 Maliki in the Sahara;
 Shafi'i in Southeast Asia and the Horn of Africa;
 Hanbali in parts of the Arabian Peninsula
The first three schools "held Saudi inspired puritanism" (the Hanbali school) in "great suspicion on account of its sectarian character," according to Gilles Kepel. But the legitimacy of this class of traditional Islamic jurists had become undermined in the 1950s and 60s by the power of post-colonial nationalist governments. In "the vast majority" of Muslim countries, the private religious endowments (awqaf) that had supported the independence of the Islamic scholars/jurists for centuries were taken over by the state and the jurists were made salaried employees. The nationalist rulers naturally encouraged their employees (and their employees interpretations of Islam) to serve their employer/rulers' interests, and inevitably the jurists came to be seen by the Muslim public as doing so.

In Egypt's "shattering" 1967 defeat, Land, Sea and Air had been the military slogan; in the perceived victory of the October 1973 war, it was replaced with the Islamic battle cry of Allahu Akbar. While the Yom Kippur War was started by Egypt and Syria to take back the land conquered in 1967 by Israel, according to Kepel the "real victors" of the war were the Arab "oil-exporting countries", whose embargo against Israel's Western allies stopped Israel's counter-offensive. The embargo's political success enhanced the prestige of the embargo-ers and the reduction in the global supply of oil sent oil prices soaring (from US$3 per barrel to nearly $12) and with them, oil exporter revenues. This put Arab oil-exporting states in a "clear position of dominance within the Muslim world." The most dominant was Saudi Arabia, the largest exporter by far (see bar chart below).

Saudi Arabians viewed their oil wealth not as an accident of geology or history, but directly connected to their practice of religion—a blessing given them by God, "vindicate them in their separateness from other cultures and religions," but also something to "be solemnly acknowledged and lived up to" with pious behavior, and so "legitimize" its prosperity and buttressing and "otherwise fragile" dynasty.

With its new wealth the rulers of Saudi Arabia sought to replace nationalist movements in the Muslim world with Islam, to bring Islam "to the forefront of the international scene", and to unify Islam worldwide under the a single Salafi creed, paying particular attention to Muslims who had immigrated to the West (a "special target"). In the words of journalist Scott Shane, "when Saudi imams arrived in Muslim countries in Asia or Africa, or in Muslim communities in Europe or the Americas, wearing traditional Arabian robes, speaking the language of the Quran — and carrying a generous checkbook — they had automatic credibility."

Non-Salafi Muslim influence
For Salafists, working with grassroots non-Salafi Islamist groups and individuals had significant advantages, because outside of Saudi Arabia the audience for Salafi doctrines were limited to the elites and "religiously conservative milieus," and majority of people were upon popular folk culture associated with local variants of Sufism. When Saudi first took control of the Hejaz, the Wahhabi Salafis in particular, made up less than 1% of the world Muslim population. Saudi Arabia founded and funded transnational organizations and headquartered them in the kingdom—the most well known being the World Muslim League—but many of the guiding figures in these bodies were foreign Salafis (including the Muslim Brotherhood, an organization defined as Salafi in the broad sense), not Arabian Wahhabis or Indian Ahl-e-Hadith. The World Muslim League distributed books and cassettes by non-Salafi foreign Islamist activists including Hassan al-Banna (founder of the Muslim Brotherhood), Sayyid Qutb (Egyptian founder of radical Salafi-Jihadist doctrine of Qutbism), etc. Members of the Brotherhood also provided "critical manpower" for the international efforts of the Muslim World League and other Saudi backed organizations. Saudi Arabia successfully courted academics at Al-Azhar University, and invited radical Islamists to teach at its own universities where they influenced Saudis like Osama bin Laden.

One observer (Trevor Stanley) argues that "Saudi Arabia is commonly characterized as aggressively exporting Wahhabism, it has in fact imported pan-Islamic Salafism," which influenced native Saudi religious/political beliefs. Muslim Brotherhood members fleeing persecution of Arab nationalist regimes in Egypt and Syria were given refuge in Saudi and sometimes ended up teaching in Saudi schools and universities. Muhammad Qutb, the brother of the highly influential Sayyid Qutb, came to Saudi Arabia after being released from prison. There he taught as a professor of Islamic Studies and edited and published the books of his older brother who had been executed by the Egyptian government. Hassan al-Turabi who later became the "éminence grise" in the government of Sudanese president Jaafar Nimeiri spent several years in exile in Saudi Arabia. "Blind Shiekh" Omar Abdel-Rahman lived in Saudi Arabia from 1977 to 1980 teaching at a girls' college in Riyadh. Al-Qaeda leader, Ayman al-Zawahiri, was also allowed into Saudi Arabia in the 1980s. Abdullah Yusuf Azzam, sometimes called "the father of the modern global jihad," was a lecturer at King Abdul Aziz University in Jeddah, Saudi Arabia, after being fired from his teaching job in Jordan and until he left for Pakistan in 1979. His famous fatwa Defence of the Muslim Lands, the First Obligation after Faith, was supported by leading Salafi Sheikh Abd al-Aziz ibn Baz, and Muhammad ibn al Uthaymeen. Muslim Brethren who became wealthy in Saudi Arabia became key contributors to Egypt's Islamist movements.

Saudi Arabia backed the Pakistan-based Jamaat-i-Islami movement politically and financially even before the oil embargo (since the time of King Saud). Jamaat's educational networks received Saudi funding and Jamaat was active in the "Saudi-dominated" Muslim World League. The constituent council of the Muslim World League included non-Salafi Islamists and Islamic revivalists such as Said Ramadan, son-in-law of Hasan al-Banna (the founder of the Muslim Brotherhood), Abul A'la Maududi (founder of Jamaat-i-Islami), Maulanda Abu'l-Hasan Nadvi (d. 2000) of India. In 2013 when the Bangladeshi government cracked down on Jamaat-e Islami for war crimes during the Bangladesh liberation war, Saudi Arabia expressed its displeasure by cutting back on the number of Bangladeshi guest workers allowed to work in (and sent badly needed remittances from) Saudi Arabia.

Scholar Olivier Roy describes the cooperation beginning in the 1980s between Saudis and Arab Muslim Brothers as "a kind of joint venture." "The Muslim Brothers agreed not to operate in Saudi Arabia itself, but served as a relay for contacts with foreign Islamist movements" and as a "relay" in South Asia with "long established" movements like the Jamaat-i Islami and older Salafi reform movement of Ahl-i Hadith. "Thus the MB played an essential role in the choice of organisations and individuals likely to receive Saudi subsidies." Roy describes the Muslim Brotherhood and the Salafis as sharing "common themes of a reformist and puritanical preaching"; "common references" to Hanbali jurisprudence, while rejecting sectarianism in Sunni juridical schools; virulent opposition to both Shiism and popular Sufi religious practices (the veneration of Muslim saints). Along with cooperation there was also competition between the two even before the Gulf War, with (for example) Saudis supporting the Islamic Salvation Front in Algeria and Jamil al-Rahman in Afghanistan, while the Brotherhood supported the movement of Sheikh Mahfoud Nahnah in Algeria and the Hezb-e Islami in Afghanistan. Gilles Kepel describes the MB and Saudis as sharing "the imperative of returning to Islam's `fundamentals` and the strict implementation of all its injunctions and prohibitions in the legal, moral, and private spheres"; and David Commins, as their both having a "strong revulsion" against western influences and an "unwavering confidence" that Islam is both the true religion and a "sufficient foundation for conducting worldly affairs." The "significant doctrinal differences" between the MBs/Islamists/Islamic revivalists include the Brotherhood's focus on "Muslim unity to ward off western imperialism"; on the importance of "eliminating backwardness" in the Muslim world through "mass public education, health care, minimum wages and constitutional government" (Commins); and its toleration of revolutionary as well as conservative social groups, contrasted with the exclusively social conservative orientation of Salafism.

Salafi alliances with, or assistance to, other conservative non-Salafi Sunni groups have not necessarily been permanent or without tension. A major rupture came after the August 1990 Invasion of Kuwait by Saddam Hussein's Iraq, which was opposed by the Saudi kingdom and supported by most if not all Islamic Revivalist groups, including many who had been funded by the Saudis. Saudi government and foundations had spent many millions on transportation, training, etc. Jihadist fighters in Afghanistan, many of whom then returned to their own country, including Saudi Arabia, to continue jihad with attacks on civilians. Osama bin Laden's passport was revoked in 1994. In March 2014 the Saudi government declared the Muslim Brotherhood a "terrorist organization." The "Islamic State", whose "roots are in Wahhabism," has vowed to overthrow the Saudi kingdom. In July 2015, Saudi author Turki al-Hamad lamented in an interview on Saudi Rotana Khalijiyya Television that "Our youth" serves as "fuel for ISIS” driven by the "prevailing" Saudi culture. "It is our youth who carry out bombings. … You can see [in ISIS videos] the volunteers in Syria ripping up their Saudi passports.” (An estimated 2,500 Saudis have fought with ISIS.)

Influence of other conservative Sunni gulf-states

The other Gulf Kingdoms were smaller in population and oil wealth than Saudi Arabia but some (particularly UAE, Kuwait, Qatar) also aided conservative Sunni causes, including jihadist groups. According to The Atlantic magazine “Qatar's military and economic largesse has made its way" to the al-Qaida group operating in Syria, "Jabhat al-Nusra”. According to a secret memo signed by Hillary Clinton, released by Wikileaks, Qatar has the worst record of counter-terrorism cooperation with the US. In March 2022, the Fourth High-Level Strategic Dialogue between the State of Qatar & the United Nations Office of Counter-Terrorism (UNOCT) discussed strategic priorities and collaboration for effective United Nations support to Member States on counter-terrorism. The State of Qatar is the second largest contributor to the United Nations Trust Fund for Counter-Terrorism out of a total 35 other donors. According to journalist Owen Jones, "powerful private" Qatar citizens are "certainly" funding the self-described "Islamic State" and "wealthy Kuwaitis" are funding  Islamist groups "like Jabhat al-Nusra" in Syria. In Kuwait the "Revival of Islamic Heritage Society" funds al-Qaida according to US Treasury. According to Kristian Coates Ulrichsen, (an associate fellow at Chatham House), “High profile Kuwaiti clerics were quite openly supporting groups like al-Nusra, using TV programmes in Kuwait to grandstand on it.”

In mid 2017, tensions escalated between Saudi Arabia / UAE and Qatar, related to the way in which, and to what groups, Salafism is being propagated.

Examples of the result of influence 
Scott Shane of the New York Times gives the high percentage of Muslim supporting strict traditional punishments (citing a Pew Research study) as an example of Salafi influence in those countries. The Pew Research Center study reports that as of 2011,
 82% of Muslims polled in Egypt and Pakistan, 70% in Jordan, and 56% in Nigeria support the stoning of people who commit adultery;  
 82% of Muslims polled in Pakistan, 77% in Egypt, 65% in Nigeria and 58% in Jordan support whippings and cutting off of hands for crimes like theft and robbery;
 86% of Muslims polled in Jordan, 84% in Egypt, and 76% in Pakistan support the death penalty for those who leave the Muslim religion.
According to Shane the influence of Saudi teaching on Muslim culture is particularly and literally visible in "parts of Africa and Southeast Asia", more women cover their hair and more men have grown beards.

Types of influences

Pre-oil influence
Early in the 20th century, before the appearance of oil export wealth, other factors gave Salafiyya movement appeal to some Muslims according to one scholar (Khaled Abou El Fadl).
 Arab nationalism, (in the Arab Muslim world) which followed the Arab Salafi-Wahhabi attack on the (non-Arab) Ottoman Empire. Although the Salafis strongly opposed nationalism, the fact that they were Arab undoubtedly appealed to the large majority of Ottoman Empire citizens who were Arab also;
 Religious reformism, which followed a return to Salaf (as-Salaf aṣ-Ṣāliḥ);
 Destruction of the Hejaz Khilafa in 1925 (which had attempted to replace the Ottoman Caliphate);
 Control of Mecca and Medina, which gave Salafis great influence on Muslim culture and thinking;

"Petro-dollars"

According to scholar Gilles Kepel, (who devoted a chapter of his book Jihad to the subject - "Building Petro-Islam on the Ruins of Arab Nationalism"), in the years immediately after the 1973 War, `petro-Islam` was a "sort of nickname" for a "constituency" of Salafi preachers and Muslim intellectuals who promoted "strict implementation of the sharia [Islamic law] in the political, moral and cultural spheres". Estimates of Saudi spending on religious causes abroad include "upward of $100 billion"; between $2 and 3 billion per year since 1975 (compared to the annual Soviet propaganda budget of $1 billion/year); and "at least $87 billion" from 1987-2007. Funding came from the Saudi government, foundations, private sources such as networks based on religious authorities.

In the coming decades, Saudi Arabia's interpretation of Islam became influential (according to Kepel) through 
the spread of Salafi religious doctrines via Saudi charities;
an increased migration of Muslims to work in Saudi Arabia and other Persian Gulf states;
a shift in the balance of power among Muslim states toward the oil-producing countries.

The use of petrodollars on facilities for the hajj—for example leveling hill peaks to make room for tents, providing electricity for tents and cooling pilgrims with ice and air conditioning—has also been described as part of "Petro-Islam" (by author Sandra Mackey), and a way of winning the loyalty of the Muslim faithful to the Saudi government. Kepel describes Saudi control of the two holy cities as "an essential instrument of hegemony over Islam."

Religious funding

According to the World Bank, Saudi Arabia, Kuwait, and the United Arab Emirates provided official development assistance (ODA) to poor countries, averaging 1.5% of their gross national income (GNI) from 1973 to 2008, about five times the average assistance provided by Organisation for Economic Co-operation and Development (OECD) member states such as the United States. From 1975 to 2005, the Saudi Arabia government donated £49 billion in aid - the most per capita of any donor country per capita.  (This aid was to Muslim causes and countries, in 2006 Saudi made its first donation to a non-Muslim country—Cambodia.)

The Saudi ministry for religious affairs printed and distributed millions of Qurans free of charge. They also printed and distributed doctrinal texts following Salafi interpretations. In mosques throughout the world "from the African plains to the rice paddies of Indonesia and the Muslim immigrant high-rise housing projects of European cities, the same books could be found," paid for by Saudi Arabian government. (According to journalist Dawood al-Shirian, the Saudi Arabian government, foundations and private sources, provide "90% of the expenses of the entire faith", throughout the Muslim World.) The European Parliament quotes an estimate of $10 billion being spent by Saudi Arabia to promote Salafi missionary activities through charitable foundations such as the International Islamic Relief Organization (IIRO), the al-Haramain Foundation, the Medical Emergency Relief Charity (MERC), World Muslim League and the World Assembly of Muslim Youth (WAMY).

Hajj

Hajj—"the greatest and most sacred annual assembly of Muslims on earth"—takes place in the Hijaz region of Saudi Arabia. While only 90,000 pilgrims visited Mecca in 1926, since 1979 between 1.5 million and 2 million Muslims have made the pilgrims each year. Saudi control of the Hajj has been called "an essential instrument of hegemony over Islam."

In 1984, a massive printing complex was opened to print Qurans to give to each pilgrim. This was popularly viewd as the evidence for "Wahhabi generosity that was borne back to every corner of the Muslim community." King Fahd spent millions on "vast white marble halls and decorative arches" to enlarge worship space to hold "several hundred thousand more pilgrims."

In 1986 the Saudi king took the title of the "Custodian of the Two Holy Places", the better to emphasize Salafi control of Mecca and Medina.

Education 

Saudi universities and religious institutes have trained thousands of teachers and preachers urging them to revive `Salafi` Islam. David Commins say they are propagating such doctrines frequently for "the idea of a pristine form of Islam practiced by the early Muslim generations". From Indonesia to France to Nigeria, the Saudi-trained and inspired Muslims aspire to rid religious practices of (what they believe to be) heretical innovations and to instill strict morality.

The Islamic University of Madinah was established as an alternative to the famous and venerable Al-Azhar University in Cairo which was under Nasserist control in 1961 when the Islamic University was founded. The school was not under the jurisdiction of the  Saudi grand mufti. The school was intended to education students from across the Muslim world, and eventually 85% of its student body was non-Saudi making it an import tool for spreading Salafi Islam internationally.

Many of Egypt's future ulama attended the university. Muhammad Sayyid Tantawy, who later became the grand mufti of Egypt, spent four years at the Islamic University. Tantawy demonstrated his devotion to the kingdom in a June 2000 interview with the Saudi newspaper Ain al-Yaqeen, where he blamed the "violent campaign" against Saudi human rights policy on the campaigners' antipathy towards Islam. "Saudi Arabia leads the world in the protection of human rights because it protects them according to the sharia of God."

According to Mohamed Charfi, a former minister of education in Tunisia, "Saudi Arabia ... has also been one of the main supporters of Islamic fundamentalism because of its financing of schools following the ... Wahhabi doctrine. Saudi-backed madrasas in Pakistan and Afghanistan have played significant roles" in the strengthening of "radical Islam" there.

Saudi funding to Egypt's al-Azhar center of Islamic learning, has been credited with causing that institution to adopt a more religiously conservative approach.

Following the October 2002 Bali bombings, an Indonesian commentator (Jusuf Wanandi) worried about the danger of "extremist influences of Wahhabism from Saudi Arabia" in the educational system.

Literature 
The works of one strict classical Islamic jurist often cited in Salafi books — Ibn Taymiyyah — were distributed for free throughout the world starting in the 1950s. Critics complain that Ibn Taymiyyah has been cited by perpetrators of violence or fanaticism: "Muhammad abd-al-Salam Faraj, the spokesperson for the group that assassinated Egyptian President Anwar Sadat in 1981; in GIA tracts calling for  the massacre of `infidels`during the Algerian civil war in the 1990s; and today on Internet sites exhorting Muslim women in the west to wear veils as a religious obligation."

Insofar as curriculum used by foreign students in Saudi Arabia or in Saudi-sponsored schools mirrors that of Saudi schools, critics complain that traditionally it “encourages violence toward others, and misguides the pupils into believing that in order to safeguard their own religion, they must violently repress and even physically eliminate the ‘other.’”

As of 2006, despite promises by then Saudi foreign minister Prince Saud Al-Faisal, that “...the whole system of education is being transformed from top to bottom,” the Center for Religious Freedom found

the Saudi public school religious curriculum continues to propagate an ideology of hate toward the “unbeliever,” that is, Christians, Jews, Shiites, Sufis, Sunni Muslims who do not follow Wahhabi doctrine, Hindus, atheists and others. This ideology is introduced in a religion textbook in the first grade and reinforced and developed in following years of the public education system, culminating in the twelfth grade, where a text instructs students that it is a religious obligation to do “battle” against infidels in order to spread the faith.

A study was undertaken by the Policy Exchange.  Published material was examined from many mosques and Islamic institutions within the United Kingdom.  The 2007 study uncovered a considerable volume of Salafi material.  The preface-wording of the first (of 11 recommendations of the study) says, "The Kingdom of Saudi Arabia must come clean about the publication and dissemination of this material abroad".  The study report is entitled, The hijacking of British Islam: How extremist literature is subverting mosques in the UK.

Literature translations 

In distributing free copies of English translations of the Quran, Saudi Arabia naturally used interpretations favored by its religious establishment. An example being sura 33, aya 59 where a literal translation of a verse (according to critic Khaled M. Abou El Fadl) would read:

O Prophet! Tell your wives and thy daughters and the women of the believers to lower (or possibly, draw upon themselves) their garments.  This is better so that they will not be known and molested.  And, God is forgiving and merciful.

while the authorized version reads:

O Prophet! Tell your wives and thy daughters and the women of the believers to draw their cloaks (veils) all over their bodies (i.e. screen themselves completely except the eyes or one eye to see the way). That will be better, that they should be known (as free respectable women) so as not to be annoyed. And Allah is Ever Oft-Forgiving, Most Merciful.
For two more examples of the slant in the Wahhabi translation see Abou El Fadl, Khaled M. Conference of the Books: The Search for Beauty in Islam, (Lanham, MD, 2001), ppl 294-301.

In the translation of the Al-Fatiha, the first surah, parenthetical references to Jews and Christians are added, speaking of addressing Allah "those who earned Your Anger (such as the Jews), nor of those who went astray (such as the Christians)."  According to Seyyed Hossein Nasr, professor of Islamic studies at George Washington University and the editor in chief of The Study Quran, these explanations of who makes God angry and who went astray have "no basis in Islamic tradition."

Passages in commentaries and Tafsir that Salafis disapproved of were deleted, such as a nineteenth century Sufi scholar's  reference to Wahhabis as the "agents of the devil".

Mosques 

More than 1,500 Mosques were built around the world from 1975 to 2000 paid for by Saudi public funds.
The Saudi-headquartered and financed Muslim World League played a pioneering role in supporting Islamic associations, mosques, and investment plans for the future. It opened offices in "every area of the world where Muslims lived."   The process of financing mosques usually involved presenting a local office of the Muslim World League with evidence of the need for a mosque/Islamic center to obtain the offices `recommendation` (tazkiya). that the Muslim group hoping for a mosque would present, not to the Saudi government, but to "a generous donor" within the kingdom or the United Arab Emirates.

Saudi-financed mosques did not local Islamic architectural traditions, but were built in the austere Salafi style, using marble `international style` design and green neon lighting. An example is Gazi Husrev-beg in Sarajevo whose restoration was funded and supervised by Saudis, was stripped of its ornate Ottoman tilework and painted wall decorations, to the disapproval of some local Muslims.

Televangelism
One of the most popular Islamic preachers is Indian "televangelist", 
Zakir Naik, a controversial figure who believes that then US President George W. Bush orchestrated the 9/11 attacks.
Naik dresses in a suit rather than traditional garb and gives colloquial lectures  speaking in English not Urdu.
His Peace TV channel, reaches a reported 100 million viewers,
According to Indian journalist Shoaib Daniyal, Naik's "massive popularity amongst India's English-speaking Muslims" is a reflection of "how deep Salafism has spread its roots".

Naik has gotten at least some publicity and funds in the form of Islamic awards from Saudi and other Gulf states. His awards include: 
the 2015 King Faisal International Prize for Services to Islam worth $200,000;
Islamic Personality of the Year Award 2013 from the Dubai International Holy Quran Award. The award was presented by Hamdan bin Rashid Al Maktoum, Ruler of Dubai and Minister of Finance and Industry of the United Arab Emirates;
The 2013 Sharjah Award for Voluntary Work from the Sultan bin Muhammad Al-Qasimi, emir of Sharjah (one of the emirates of the UAE).

Other means

According to critic Khaled Abou El Fadl, the funding available to those who support official Saudi-backed Salafi views has incentivized Muslim "schools, book publishers, magazines, newspapers, or even governments" around the world to "shape their behavior, speech, and thought in such a way as to incur and benefit from Saudi largesse." An example being the salary for "a Muslim scholar spending a six-month sabbatical" at a Saudi Arabian university, is more than ten years of pay "teaching at the Azhar University in Egypt." Thus acts such as "failing to veil" or failing to advocate veiling can mean the difference between "enjoying a decent standard of living or living in abject poverty.”

Another incentive available to the Saudi Arabia, according to Abou el Fadl, is the power to grant or deny scholars a visa for hajj.

According to Khalid Abou el Fadl, books by alternative non-Saudi scholars of Salafism have been made scarce by Saudi government approved Salafis who have discouraged distributing  copies of their work.  Examples of such authors are the Syrian Salafi scholar Rashid Rida, Yemeni jurist Muhammad al-Amir al-Husayni al-San'ani, and Muhammad Ibn Abd al-Wahhab's own brother and critic Sulayman Ibn Abd al-Wahhab.

One critic who suffered at the hands of Saudi-backed Wahhabi Salafists was an influential Salafi jurist, Muhammad al-Ghazali (d. 1996) who wrote a critique of the influence of Wahhabi Salafism upon the "Salafi creed"—its alleged "literalism, anti-rationalism, and anti-interpretive approach to Islamic texts".  Despite the fact that al-Ghazali took care to use the term "Ahl al-Hadith" not "Wahhabi", the reaction to his book was "frantic and explosive", according to Abou el Fadl. Not only did a "large number" of "puritans" write to condemn al-Ghazali and "to question his motives and competence", but "several major" religious conferences were held in Egypt and Saudi Arabia to criticize the book, and the Saudi newspaper al-Sharq al-Awsat published "several long article responding to al-Ghazali." Saudi-backed Salafis  "successfully preventing the republication of his work" even in his home country of Egypt, and "generally speaking made his books very difficult to locate."

Islamic banking
One mechanism for the redistribution of (some) oil revenues from Saudi Arabia and other Muslim oil-exporters, to the poorer Muslim nations of Africa and Asia, was the Islamic Development Bank. Headquartered in Saudi Arabia, it opened for business in 1975. Its lenders and borrowers were member states of Organisation of the Islamic Conference (OIC) and it strengthened "Islamic cohesion" between them. 

Saudi Arabians also helped establish Islamic banks with private investors and depositors.  DMI (Dar al-Mal al-Islami: the House of Islamic Finance), founded in 1981 by Prince Mohammed bin Faisal Al Saud, and the Al Baraka group, established in 1982 by Sheik Saleh Abdullah Kamel (a Saudi billionaire), were both transnational holding companies.

By 1995, there were "144 Islamic financial institutions worldwide", (not all of them Saudi financed) including 33 government-run banks, 40 private banks, and 71 investment companies. As of 2014, about $2 trillion of banking assets were "sharia-compliant".

Migration

By 1975, over one million workers—from unskilled country people to experienced professors, from Sudan, Pakistan, India, Southeast Asia, Egypt, Palestine, Lebanon, and Syria—had moved to Saudi Arabia and the Persian Gulf states to work, and return after a few years with savings. A majority of these workers were Arab and most were Muslim. Ten years later the number had increased to 5.15 million and Arabs were no longer in the majority. 43% (mostly Muslims) came from the Indian subcontinent. In one country, Pakistan, in a single year, (1983), 
"the money sent home by Gulf emigrants amounted to $3 billion, compared with a total of $735 million given to the nation in foreign aid. .... The underpaid petty functionary of yore could now drive back to his hometown at the wheel of a foreign car, build himself a house in a residential suburb, and settle down to invest his savings or engage in trade.... he owed nothing to his home state, where he could never have earned enough to afford such luxuries."

Muslims who had moved to Saudi Arabia, or other "oil-rich monarchies of the peninsula" to work, often returned to their poor home country following religious practice more intensely, particularly practices of Salafi Muslims. 
Having grown prosperous in a Salafi environment, it was not surprising that the returning Muslims believed there was a connection between a Salafu environment and its "material prosperity", and that on return they followed religious practices more intensely and that those practices followed tenets of Salafi.  Kepel gives examples of migrant workers returning home with new affluence, asking to be addressed by servants as "hajja" rather than "Madame" (the old bourgeois custom). Another imitation of Saudi Arabia adopted by affluent migrant workers was increased segregation of the sexes, including shopping areas. (It has also been suggested that Saudi Arabia has used cutbacks on the number of workers from a country allowed to work in it to punish a country for domestic policies it disapproves of.)

As of 2013 there are some 9 million registered foreign workers and at least a few million more illegal immigrants in Saudi Arabia, about half of the estimated 16 million citizens in the kingdom.

State leadership

In the 1950s and 1960s Gamal Abdel Nasser, the leading exponent of Arab nationalism and the president of the Arab world's largest country had great prestige and popularity among Arabs.

However, in 1967 Nasser led the Six-Day War against Israel which ended not in the elimination of Israel but in the decisive defeat of the Arab forces and loss of a substantial chunk of Egyptian territory. This defeat, combined with the economic stagnation from which Egypt suffered, were contrasted six years later with an embargo by the Arab "oil-exporting countries" against Israel's western allies that stopped Israel's counteroffensive, and Saudi Arabia great economic power.

This not only devastated Arab nationalism vis-a-vis the Islamic revival for the hearts and minds of Arab Muslims but changed "the balance of power among Muslim states", with Saudi Arabia and other oil-exporting countries gaining as Egypt lost influence.  The oil-exporters emphasized "religious commonality" among Arabs, Turks, Africans, and Asians, and downplayed "differences of language, ethnicity, and nationality." 

The Organisation of Islamic Cooperation—whose permanent Secretariat is located in Jeddah in Western Saudi Arabia—was founded after the 1967 war.

Saudi Arabia has expressed its displeasure with policies of poor Muslim countries by not hiring or expelling nationals from the country, thus denying them badly needed workers' remittances. In 2013 it punished the government of Bangladesh by lessening the number of Bangladeshis allowed to enter Saudi after a crackdown in Bangladesh on the Islamist Jamaat-e Islami party, which according to the Economist magazine "serves as a standard-bearer" for Saudi Arabia's "strand of Islam in Bangladesh". (In fiscal year 2012, Bangladesh received $3.7 billion in official remittances from Saudi Arabia, "which is quite a lot more than either receives in economic aid.")

Influence on Islamism
According to one source (Olivier Roy), the fusion/joint venture/hybridisation of the two Sunni movements (Salafiyya movement and Sunni Islamism) helped isolate Islamist Shia Islamic Republic of Iran, and move Islamism more towards fundamentalism or "neofundamentalism", where opposition to the West is "expressed in religious terms", i.e. "criticism of Christianity" and "marked anti-Semitism".
In Afghanistan for example, the Salafis circulated an anti-Shiite pamphlet titled Tuhfa-i ithna ashariyya (The gift of the twelver Shia) republished in Turkey in 1988 and widely distributed in Peshwar. In turn, articles and stories of how Salafism allegedly is "a creation of British imperialism" circulate in some Iranian circles.

Military jihad

During the 1980s and ’90s, the monarchy and the clerics of Saudi Arabia helped to channel tens of millions of dollars to Sunni jihad fighters in Afghanistan, Bosnia and elsewhere. While apart from the Afghan jihad against the Soviets and perhaps the Taliban jihad, the jihads may not have worked to propagate conservative Islam, and the numbers of their participants was relatively small, they did have considerable impact.

Afghan jihad against Soviets

The Afghan jihad against the Soviet Army following the Soviet's December 1979 invasion of Kabul Afghanistan, has been called a "great cause with which Islamists worldwide identified,"  and the peak of Salafii-Islamist and Islamic Revivalist "collaboration and triumph.”  The Saudis spent several billion dollars (along with the United States and Pakistan), supported with "financing, weaponry, and intelligence" the native Afghan and "Afghan Arabs" mujahideen (fighters of jihad) fighting the Soviets and their Afghan allies. The Saudi government  provided approximately $4 billion in aid to the mujahidin from 1980-1990, that went primarily to militarily ineffective but ideologically kindred Hezbi Islami and Ittehad-e Islami.  Other funding for volunteers came from the Saudi Red Crescent, Muslim World League, and privately, from Saudi princes. At "training camps and religious schools (madrasa)" across the frontier in Pakistan—more than 100,000 Muslim volunteer fighters from 43 countries over the years—were provided with "radical, extremist indoctrination". 
Mujahidin training camps in Pakistan trained not just volunteers fighting the Soviets but Islamists returning to Kashmir (including the Kashmir Hizb-i Islami) and Philippine (Moros), among others. Among the foreign volunteers there were more Saudi nationals than any other nationality in 2001 according to Jane's International Security. In addition to training and indoctrination the war served as “as a crucible for the synthesis of disparate Islamic revivalist organizations into loose coalition of likeminded jihadist groups that viewed the war" not as a struggle between freedom and foreign tyranny, but "between Islam and unbelief.”  
The war turned Jihadists from a "relatively insignificant" group into "a major force in the Muslim world."
 
The 1988-89 withdrawal by the Soviets from Afghanistan leaving the Soviet allied Afghan Marxists to their own fate was interpreted by jihad fighters and supporters as "a sign of God's favor and the righteousness of their struggle.”
Afghan Arabs volunteers returned from Afghanistan to join local Islamist groups in struggles against their allegedly “apostate” governments. Others went to fight jihad in places such as Bosnia, Chechnya and Kashmir. In at least one case a former Soviet fighter -- Jumma Kasimov of Uzbekistan—went on to fight jihad in his ex-Soviet Union state home, setting up the headquarters of his Islamic Movement of Uzbekistan in Taliban Afghanistan in 1997, and reportedly given millions of dollars worth of aid by Osama bin Laden.

Saudi Arabia saw its support for jihad against the Soviets as a way to counter the Iranian Revolution—which initially generated considerable enthusiasm among Muslims—and contain its revolutionary, anti-monarchist influence (and also Shia influence in general) in the region. Its funding was also accompanied by Salafi literature and preachers who helped propagate the faith. With the help of Pakistani Deobandi groups, it oversaw the creation of new madrassas and mosques in Pakistan, which increased the influence of Sunni Salafi Islam in that country and prepare recruits for the jihad in Afghanistan.

Afghanistan Taliban

During the Soviet-Afghan war, Islamic schools (madrassas) for Afghan refugees in Pakistan appeared in the 1980s near the Afghan-Pakistan border.  Initially funded by zakat donations from Pakistan, nongovernmental organizations in Saudi Arabia and other Gulf states became "important backers" later on.  Many were radical schools sponsored by the Pakistan JUI religious party and became "a supply line for jihad" in Afghanistan. According to analysts the ideology of the schools became "hybridization" of the Deobandi school of the Pakistani sponsors and the Salafism supported by Saudi financers.

Several years after the Soviet withdrawal and fall of the Marxist government, many of these Afghan refugee students developed as a religious-political-military force to stop the civil war among Afghan mujahideen factions and unify (most of) the country under their "Islamic Emirate of Afghanistan".  (Eight Taliban government ministers came from one school, Dar-ul-Uloom Haqqania.) While in power, the Taliban implemented the "strictest interpretation of Sharia law ever seen in the Muslim world," and was noted for its harsh treatment of women.

Saudis helped the Taliban in a number of ways.  Saudi Arabia was one of only three countries (Pakistan and United Arab Emirates being the others) officially to recognize the Taliban as the official government of Afghanistan before the 9/11 attacks, (after 9/11 no country recognized it). King Fahd of Saudi Arabia “expressed happiness at the good measures taken by the Taliban and over the imposition of shari’a in our country," During a visit by the Taliban's leadership to the kingdom in 1997.

According to Pakistani journalist Ahmed Rashid who spent much time in Afghanistan, in the mid 1990s the Taliban asked Saudis for money and materials.  Taliban leader Mullah Omar told Ahmed Badeeb, the chief of staff of the  Saudi General Intelligence: `Whatever Saudi Arabia wants me to do,   ... I will do`. The Saudis in turn "provided fuel, money, and hundreds of new pickups to the Taliban ... Much of this aid was flown in to Kandahar from the Gulf port city of Dubai," according to Rashid. Another source, a witness to lawyers for the families of 9/11 victims, testified in a sworn statement that in 1998 he had seen an emissary for the director general of  Al Mukhabarat Al A'amah, Saudi Arabia's intelligence agency prince, Turki bin Faisal Al Saud, hand a check for one billion Saudi riyals (approximately $267 million as of 10/2015) to a top Taliban leader in Afghanistan.  (The Saudi government denies providing any funding and it is thought that the funding came not from the government but from wealthy Saudis and possibly other gulf Arabs who were urged to support the Taliban by the influential Saudi Grand Mufti Abd al-Aziz ibn Baz.
) After the Taliban captured the Afghan capital Kabul, Saudi expat Osama bin Laden—who though  in very bad graces with the Saudi government was very much influenced by Salafism or the Muslim Brotherhood-Salafiyya hybrid—provided the Taliban with funds, use of his training camps and veteran "Arab-Afghan  forces for combat, and engaged in all-night conversations with the Taliban leadership.

Saudi Salafi practices, also influenced the Deobandi Taliban. One example was the Saudi religious police, according to Rashid. `I remember that all the Taliban who had worked or done hajj in Saudi Arabia were terribly impressed by the religious police and tried to copy that system to the letter. The money for their training and salaries came partly from Saudi Arabia.` The taliban also practiced public beheadings common in Saudi Arabia. Ahmed Rashid came across ten thousand men and children gathering at Kandahar football stadium one Thursday afternoon, curious as to why (the Taliban had banned sports) he "went inside to discover a convicted murderer being led between the goalposts to be executed by a member of the victim's family."

The Taliban's brutal treatment of Shia, and the destruction of Buddhist statues in Bamiyan Valley may also have been influenced by Salafism, which had a history of attacking Shia Muslims whom they considered heretics.  In late July 1998, the Taliban used the trucks (donated by Saudis) mounted with machine guns to capture the northern town of Mazar-e-Sharif. "Ahmed Rashid later estimated that 6000 to 8000 Shia men, women and children were slaughtered in a rampage of murder and rape that included slitting people's throats and bleeding them to death, halal-style, and baking hundreds of victims into shipping containers without water to be baked alive in the desert sun."
 This reminded at least one writer (Dore Gold) of the Salafi attack on Shia shrine in Karbala in 1802.

Another activity Afghan Muslims had not engaged in before this time was destruction of statues. In 2001, the Taliban dynamited and rocketed the nearly 2000-year-old statues Buddhist Bamiyan Valley, which had been undamaged by Afghan Sunni Muslim for centuries prior to then. Mullah Omar declared "Muslims should be proud of smashing idols. It has given praise to Allah that we have destroyed them."

Other jihads

From 1981 to 2006 an estimated 700 terror attacks outside of combat zones were perpetrated by Sunni extremists (usually Jihadi Salafis such as Al-Qaeda), killing roughly 7,000 people.  What connection, if any, there is between Wahhabism and Saudi Arabia on the one hand and Jihadi Salafis on the other, is disputed. Allegations of Saudi links to terrorism "have been the subject of years" of US "government investigations and furious debate". Wahhabism has been called "the fountainhead of Islamic extremism that promotes and legitimizes" violence against civilians (Yousaf Butt)

Between the mid-1970s and 2002 Saudi Arabia provided over $70 billion in "overseas development aid",  the vast majority of this development being religious, specifically the propagation and extension of the influence of Salafism at the expense of other forms of Islam. There has been an intense debate over whether Saudi aid and Salafism has fomented extremism in recipient countries. The two main ways in which Salafism and its funding is alleged to be connected to terror attacks are through
Basic teachings. The Salafi doctrine of [[Al-Wala' wal-Bara'|Al-Wala' wal Bara]], encourages hatred towards non-Muslims. Insofar as those hated and found intolerable are subject to violence, Salafi teachings leads to violence. The interpretation is spread (among other ways) by textbooks in Saudi Arabia and in "thousands of schools worldwide funded by fundamentalist Sunni Muslim charities".Funding attacks'''. The Saudi government and Saudi charitable foundations run by Salafi institutions have directly or indirectly aided terrorists and terrorist groups financially. According to at least one source (Anthony H. Cordesman) this flow of money from the Kingdom to outside extremist has "probably" had more effect than the kingdom's "religious thinking and missionary efforts".    In addition to donations by sincere believers in jihadism working in the charities, money for terrorists also comes as a form of pay off to terrorist groups by some members of the Saudi ruling class  in part to keep the jihadists from being more active in Saudi Arabia, according to critics. During the 1990s Al Qaeda and Jihad Islamiyya (JI) filled leadership positions in several Islamic charities with some of their most trusted men (Abuza, 2003). Al Qaeda and JI's operatives were then diverting about 15-20% and in some cases as much as 60%  of the funds to finance their operations. Zachary Abuza estimates that the 300 private Islamic charities have established their base of operations in Saudi Arabia have distributed over $10 billion worldwide in support of an Salafi-Islamist agenda”. Contributions from well off and wealthy Saudi's come from zakat, but contributions are often more like 10% rather than the obligatory 2.5% of their income producing assets, and are followed up with minimal if any investigation of the contributions results.

 Funding before 2003 
American politicians and media have accused the Saudi government of supporting terrorism and tolerating a jihadist'' culture, noting that Osama bin Laden and fifteen out of the nineteen 9/11 hijackers were from Saudi Arabia.

In 2002 a Council on Foreign Relations Terrorist Financing Task Force report found that: “For years, individuals and charities based in Saudi Arabia have been the most important source of funds for al-Qaeda. And for years, Saudi officials have turned a blind eye to this problem.”

According to a July 10, 2002, briefing given to the US Department of Defense Defense Policy Board, ("a group of prominent intellectuals and former senior officials that advises the Pentagon on defense policy.") by a Neo-Conservative (Laurent Murawiec, a RAND Corporation analyst), 
"The Saudis are active at every level of the terror chain, from planners to financiers, from cadre to foot-soldier, from ideologist to cheerleader," 

Some examples of funding are checks written by Princess Haifa bint Faisal—the wife of Prince Bandar bin Sultan, the Saudi ambassador to Washington—totaling as much as $73,000 ended up with Omar al-Bayoumi, a Saudi who hosted and otherwise helped two of the September 11 hijackers when they reached America. They 

Imprisoned former al-Qaeda operative, Zacarias Moussaoui, stated in deposition transcripts filed in February 2015 that more than a dozen prominent Saudi figures, (including Prince Turki al-Faisal Al Saud, a former Saudi intelligence chief) donated to al Qaeda in the late 1990s. Saudi officials have denied this.

Lawyers filing a lawsuit against Saudi Arabia for the families of 9/11 victims provided documents including 
an interview with a "self-described Qaeda operative in Bosnia" who said that the Saudi High Commission for Relief of Bosnia and Herzegovina, a charity "largely controlled by members of the royal family",  provided "money and supplies to al-Qaeda" in the 1990s and "hired militant operatives" like himself.
a "confidential German intelligence report" with "line-by-line" descriptions of bank transfers with "dates and dollar amounts" made in the early 1990s, indicating tens of millions of dollars were sent by Prince Salman bin Abdul Aziz (now King of Saudi Arabia) and other members of the Saudi royal family to a "charity that was suspected of financing militants’ activities in Pakistan and Bosnia".

Post 2003 
In 2003 there were several attacks by Al-Qaeda-connected terrorists on Saudi soil and according to American officials, in the decade since then the Saudi government has become a "valuable partner against terrorism", assisting in the fight against al-Qaeda and the Islamic State.

However,  there is some evidence Saudi support for terror continues. According to internal documents from the U.S. Treasury Department, the International Islamic Relief Organization (released by the aforementioned 9/11 family lawyers) -- a prominent Saudi charity heavily supported by members of the Saudi royal family—showed “support for terrorist organizations” at least through 2006.

US diplomatic cables released by Wikileaks in 2010 contain numerous complaints of funding of Sunni extremists by Saudis and other Gulf Arabs. 
According to a 2009 U.S. State Department communication by then United States Secretary of State, Hillary Clinton,  "donors in Saudi Arabia constitute the most significant source of funding to Sunni terrorist groups worldwide"—terrorist groups such as al-Qaeda, the Afghan Taliban, and Lashkar-e-Taiba in South Asia, for which "Saudi Arabia remains a critical financial support base". Part of this funding arises through the zakat charitable donations (one of the "Five Pillars of Islam") paid by all Saudis to charities, and amounting to at least 2.5% of their income. It is alleged that some of the charities serve as fronts for money laundering and terrorist financing operations, and further that some Saudis "know full well the terrorist purposes to which their money will be applied".

According to the US cable the problem is acute in Saudi Arabia, where militants seeking donations often come during the hajj season purporting to be pilgrims. This is  "a major security loophole since pilgrims often travel with large amounts of cash and the Saudis cannot refuse them entry into Saudi Arabia". They also set up front companies to launder funds and receive money "from government-sanctioned charities". Clinton complained in the cable of the "challenge" of persuading "Saudi officials to treat terrorist funds emanating from Saudi Arabia as a strategic priority", and that the Saudis had refused to ban three charities classified by the US as terrorist entities, despite the fact that, "Intelligence suggests" that the groups "at times, fund extremism overseas".

Besides Saudi Arabia, businesses based in the United Arab Emirates provide "significant funds" for the Afghan Taliban and their militant partners the Haqqani network according to one US embassy cable released by Wikileaks. According to a January 2010 US intelligence report, "two senior Taliban fundraisers" had regularly travelled to the UAE, where the Taliban and Haqqani networks laundered money through local front companies. (The reports complained of weak financial regulation and porous borders in the UAE, but not difficulties in persuading UAE officials of terrorist danger.)  Kuwait was described as a "source of funds and a key transit point" for al-Qaida and other militant groups, whose government was concerned about terror attacks on its own soil, but "less inclined to take action against Kuwait-based financiers and facilitators plotting attacks" in our countries.  Kuwait refused to ban the Society of the Revival of Islamic Heritage, which the US had designated a terrorist entity in June 2008 for providing aid to al-Qaida and affiliated groups, including LeT. According to the cables, "overall level" of counter-terror co-operation with the U.S. was "considered the worst in the region". More recently, in late 2014, US Vice President also complained "the Saudis, the Emirates" had "poured hundreds of millions of dollars and tens of tons of weapons" into Syria for "al-Nusra, and al-Qaeda, and the extremist elements of jihadis."

In October 2014 Zacarias Moussaoui, an Al-Qaeda member imprisoned in the US testified under oath that members of the Saudi royal family supported al Qaeda. According to Moussaoui, he was tasked by Osama bin Laden with creating a digital database to catalog al Qaeda's donors, and that donors he entered into the database including several members of the Saudi Royal family, including Prince Turki al-Faisal Al Saud, former director-general of Saudi Arabia's Foreign Intelligence Service and ambassador to the United States, and others he named in his testimony. Saudi government representatives have denied the charges. According to the 9/11 Commission Report, while it is possible that charities with significant Saudi government sponsorship diverted funds to al Qaeda, and "Saudi Arabia has long been considered the primary source of al Qaeda funding, ... we have found no evidence that the Saudi government as an institution or senior Saudi officials individually funded the organization."

As of 2014, “deep-pocket donors and charitable organizations” in the Arabian gulf, are still providing "millions of dollars worth of aid to Al Qaeda and other terrorist organizations, according to David S. Cohen, the US Department of Treasury under secretary for terrorism and financial intelligence at the time.

Teachings 
Among those who believe there is, or may be, a connection between Wahhabi movement and Al-Qaeda include F. Gregory Gause III Roland Jacquard, Rohan Gunaratna, Stephen Schwartz.

Amongst those critics who allege that Salafi influence continues to created ideological "narrative" helpful to extremist violence (if not al-Qaeda specifically) is US scholar Farah Pandith (an adjunct senior fellow at the Council on Foreign Relations) who "traveled to 80 countries between 2009 and 2014 as the first ever U.S. special representative to Muslim communities."In each place I visited, the Wahhabi influence was an insidious presence, changing the local sense of identity; displacing historic, culturally vibrant forms of Islamic practice; and pulling along individuals who were either paid to follow their rules or who became on their own custodians of the Wahhabi world view. Funding all this was Saudi money, which paid for things like the textbooks, mosques, TV stations and the training of Imams.Dore Gold points out that bin Laden was not only given a Salafi education but among other pejoratives accused his target—the United States—of being "the Hubal of the age", in need of destruction. Focus on Hubal, the seventh century stone idol, follows the Salafi focus on the importance of the need to destroy any and all idols.

Biographers of Khalid Shaikh Mohammed ("architect" of the 9/11 attacks) and Ramzi Yousef (leader of the 1993 World Trade Center bombing that Yousef hoped would topple the North Tower, killing tens of thousands of office workers) have noted the influence of Salafism through Ramzi Yousef's father, Muhammad Abdul Karim, who was introduced to Salafism in the early 1980s while working in Kuwait.

Others connect the group to Sayyid Qutb and Political Islam. Academic Natana J. DeLong-Bas, senior research assistant at the Prince Alwaleed Center for Muslim-Christian Understanding at Georgetown University, argues that though bin Laden "came to define Wahhabi Islam during the later years" of his life, his militant Islam "was not representative of Wahhabi Islam as it is practiced in contemporary Saudi Arabia" Karen Armstrong states that Osama bin Laden, like most Islamic extremists, followed the ideology of Sayyid Qutb, not "Wahhabism".

Noah Feldman distinguishes between what he calls the "deeply conservative Wahhabis" and what he calls the "followers of political Islam in the 1980s and 1990s," such as Egyptian Islamic Jihad and later al-Qaeda leader Ayman al-Zawahiri. While Saudi Wahhabis were "the largest funders of local Muslim Brotherhood chapters and other hard-line Islamists" during this time, they opposed jihadi resistance to Muslim governments and assassination of Muslim leaders because of their belief that "the decision to wage jihad lay with the ruler, not the individual believer".

More recently the self-declared "Islamic State" in Iraq and Syria headed by Abu Bakr al-Baghdadi has been described as both more violent than al-Qaeda and more closely aligned with Wahhabism. 
For their guiding principles, the leaders of the Islamic State, also known as ISIS or ISIL, are open and clear about their almost exclusive commitment to the Wahhabi movement of Sunni Islam. The group circulates images of Wahhabi religious textbooks from Saudi Arabia in the schools it controls. Videos from the group's territory have shown Wahhabi texts plastered on the sides of an official missionary van.
ISIS eventually published its own books and out of the twelve works by Muslim scholars it republished, seven were by Muhammad ibn Abd al-Wahhab, the founder of Wahhabism. Sheikh Adil al-Kalbani, a former imam of the Grand Mosque of Mecca, told a television interviewer in January 2016 that the Islamic State leaders “draw their ideas from what is written in our own books, our own principles.”

Scholar Bernard Haykel states that Wahhabism is the Islamic State's "closest religious cognate," and that "for Al Qaeda, violence is a means to an ends; for ISIS, it is an end in itself." An anonymous scholar with "long experience in Saudi Arabia", quoted by Scott Shane, describes Saudi preaching as sometimes causing a “recalibrating of the religious center of gravity” for young people, making it “easier for them to swallow or make sense of the ISIS religious narrative when it does arrive. It doesn't seem quite as foreign as it might have, had that Saudi religious influence not been there.”

According to former British intelligence officer Alastair Crooke, ISIS "is deeply Wahhabist", but also "a corrective movement to contemporary Wahhabism." In Saudi Arabia itself, the 
ruling elite is divided. Some applaud that ISIS is fighting Iranian Shiite "fire" with Sunni "fire"; that a new Sunni state is taking shape at the very heart of what they regard as a historical Sunni patrimony; and they are drawn by Da'ish's strict Salafist ideology.

Former CIA director James Woolsey described Saudi as "the soil in which Al-Qaeda and its sister terrorist organizations are flourishing." However, the Saudi government strenuously denies these claims or that it exports religious or cultural extremism.

Individual Saudi nationals 
Saudi intelligence sources estimate that from 1979 to 2001 as many as 25,000 Saudis received military training in Afghanistan and other locations abroad, and many helped in jihad outside of the Kingdom.

According to Saudi analyst Ali al-Ahmed, "more than 6,000 Saudi nationals" have been recruited into al-Qaeda armies in Iraq, Pakistan, Syria, and Yemen "since the Sept. 11 attacks". In Iraq, an estimated 3,000 Saudi nationals, "the majority of foreign fighters", were fighting alongside Al Qaeda in Iraq.

See also
Antisemitism in Islam
Antisemitism in the Arab world
Iran-Saudi Arabia conflict
Israel–Saudi Arabia relations
Islam in Saudi Arabia
Islamism
Islamism and antisemitism
Islamism and Islamic terrorism in the Balkans
Islamism in Europe
Islamism in Pakistan
Islamism in South Asia (disambiguation)
Islamism in the United Kingdom
Islamic fundamentalism
Islamic schools and branches
Muslim World League
Pakistan and state-sponsored terrorism
Petro-Islam
Political Islam
Political aspects of Islam
Salafi movement
Salafi jihadism
Sectarian violence among Muslims
Wahhabism

References

Notes

Citations

Further reading
 

Islam and politics
Islamic fundamentalism
Islamism
Sunni Islam
Wahhabism